The Joint Inspection Unit (JIU) is a United Nations unit established by resolution 31/192 of 22 December 1976 of the General Assembly of the United Nations. Its objective is to enhance the efficiency of the administrative and financial functioning of the United Nations system and, to this end, it may make on-the-spot inquiries and investigations. The Joint Inspection Unit is the only independent external oversight body of the United Nations system mandated to conduct evaluations, inspections and investigations system-wide. It is based in Geneva, Switzerland.

References

External links 
 

Government agencies established in 1976
United Nations General Assembly subsidiary organs
United Nations organizations based in Geneva